Waldemar Legień (born 28 August 1963) is a retired Polish judoka. He won two Olympic gold medals in different weight classes, in 1988 and 1992.  He is also the first person to win back-to-back two Olympic gold medals in Judo.

For his achievements, he received the Officer's Cross of the Order of Polonia Restituta (4th Class) in 1988.

Legień is the manager of Racing Club de France in Paris.

References

External links

 
 
 
 
 Judo Legends

1963 births
Living people
Polish male judoka
Judoka at the 1988 Summer Olympics
Judoka at the 1992 Summer Olympics
Olympic judoka of Poland
Olympic gold medalists for Poland
Sportspeople from Bytom
Olympic medalists in judo
Medalists at the 1992 Summer Olympics
Medalists at the 1988 Summer Olympics
Goodwill Games medalists in judo
Competitors at the 1990 Goodwill Games